The 2021 Mont Ventoux Dénivelé Challenge was the third edition of the Mont Ventoux Dénivelé Challenge road cycling one-day race, which was a category 1.1 event on the 2021 UCI Europe Tour. After the 2020 edition was postponed to August due to the COVID-19 pandemic, the race returned to its usual mid-June time slot.

The first ascent took the eastern route from Sault, while the second ascent took the southern route from Bédoin.

Teams 
Seven of the nineteen UCI WorldTeams, eight UCI ProTeams, and five UCI Continental teams made up the twenty teams that participated in the race.

UCI WorldTeams

 
 
 
 
 
 
 

UCI ProTeams

 
 
 
 
 
 
 
 

UCI Continental Teams

Result

References 

2021
Mont Ventoux Dénivelé Challenge
Mont Ventoux Dénivelé Challenge
Mont Ventoux Dénivelé Challenge